Gefreiter (abbr. Gefr.; plural Gefreite, English: private, in the military context) is a German, Swiss and Austrian military rank that has existed since the 16th century. It is usually the second rank or grade to which an enlisted soldier, airman or sailor could be promoted.

Within the combined NATO rank scale, the modern-day rank of Gefreiter is usually equivalent to the NATO-standard rank scale OR-2. The word has also been lent into the Russian language, and is in use in several Russian and post-Soviet militaries.

History
 
Historically the military rank of Gefreiter (female and plural form: Gefreite) emerged in 16th-century Europe for the German Landsknechte foot soldiers, predominantly made up of German and Swiss mercenary pikemen and supporting infantry foot soldiers. Those soldiers who proved especially reliable and experienced were appointed to gefreyten Knechten (exempted/freed Servants/Soldiers; a cognate to 'knight') and were installed in critical battlefield positions; along with their extra rank privileges they were exempted in general from sentry duties.

From the 18th century, Gefreite were the first line members of a military company, and every Gefreiter led and commanded a section or squad of Gemeine (ordinary-rank soldiers). The rank existed in the cavalry, infantry, pioneers, and artillery where the Gefreiter rank received a greater rank-class status. Gefreiter was the only enlisted rank until 1918 within the Royal Prussian Army and respectively the imperial army of the German Empire to which an exceptional enlisted soldier could be promoted on the recommendation of the Hauptmann (Captain) or Rittmeister (Cavalry-Master otherwise Captain) and ultimately endorsed by the Regiments-Commandeur (Regimental Colonel), with exception of the rank Obergefreiter (since 1859) in the foot artillery which later replaced the artillery Bombardier (Corporal) rank. The Gefreiter rank was also considered a transition rank for promotion to and wherefrom replacements were selected to the Unteroffizier (Corporal) rank. Within the Royal Prussian Army and respectively the imperial army of the German Empire, the rank Gefreiter was a deputy to the Unteroffizier (Corporal), and were distinguished by the wearing of a Auszeichnungsknopf (rank Distinction-button) known as the Gefreitenknopf (Gefreiter-button) on each side of their uniform collar, similar to the slightly larger rank collar side-buttons worn by both the Sergeant and Feldwebel ranks.

In the Royal Prussian Army until its reorganization after 1806, there existed along with Gefreiter the rank of Gefreite-Korporale who wore a silver Portepee (sword lanyard).  These were officer cadets specifically selected for higher advancement, they stood equal with their officer cadet counterpart the Portepee-Fähnriche. The Gefreite-Korporale was a rank that also existed along with Gefreiter in the Austrian Army during the Thirty Years' War.

From the 1920s the German rank of Gefreiter has expanded into several additional ranks and duties, those being Obergefreiter (Senior Lance Corporal otherwise Second Corporal in the Prussian Army since 1859); Hauptgefreiter (Leading Lance Corporal in the Luftwaffe during 1935–1944, the Kriegsmarine during 1938–1945, and the Heer from 1955); Stabsgefreiter (Staff Lance Corporal in the Reichswehr since 1927, the Kriegsmarine until 1945, the Luftwaffe from 1944 temporarily replacing Hauptgefreiter rank); and Oberstabsgefreiter (Senior Staff Lance Corporal in the Kriegsmarine since 1940, not in the Heer or Luftwaffe until 1996). All Gefreiter ranks are now in use with the German army, air force, and navy.

The female form, Gefreite, is not used by the military; the formal address is "Frau Gefreiter".

Germany

Bundeswehr

Gefreiter (abbr. Gefr. or G.) is the second enlisted rank grade within the modern-day Army (Heer), Air Force (Luftwaffe) and Navy (Marine) of the Bundeswehr. Following the NATO ranking system, Gefreiter equates to OR-2 on the NATO-standard rank scale, the rank is thus equivalent to either private, private first class, vice corporal or corporal rank depending on the chosen NATO-allied force used for the comparison. It is grade A4 in the pay scale of the Federal Ministry of Defence.

The sequence of ranks (top-down approach) in this particular group is as follows:
OR-4a: Oberstabsgefreiter 
OR-4b: Stabsgefreiter
OR-3a: Hauptgefreiter 
OR-3b: Obergefreiter 
OR-2: Gefreiter
OR-1: Soldat/Schütze (Army), Flieger (Air Force), Matrose (Navy)

In line with Bundeswehr rank advancement conditions, enlisted personnel OR-1 may be promoted to OR-2 level after passing primary recruit training (usually after three months) to the rank of Gefreiter.

Wehrmacht
Throughout the periods of the Royal Prussian Army, Imperial Army of the German Empire, Reichswehr and the German Wehrmacht, the rank of Gefreiter was considered the equivalent to a junior Lance Corporal rank, with Obergefreiter as senior lance corporal or rather second corporal in the artillery, and a full corporal rank known as Unteroffizier (subordinate non-commissioned officer) which replaced the Korporal rank from 1856. Within the army branch of the German Wehrmacht, a rank of Oberschütze (senior rifleman) once existed between the ranks of Gefreiter and Schütze/Soldat ("[enlisted] ordinary-rank rifleman/soldier"). A Gefreiter was considered an "exempted man", who was not normally assigned more menial duties, such as guard detail. A soldier promoted to Gefreiter was seen as showing some promise of leadership capability, while those who did not were promoted to Oberschütze.

Bohemian corporal
The best-known holder of the rank of Gefreiter was Adolf Hitler, who held the rank in the Bavarian Reserve Infantry Regiment 16 of the Royal Bavarian Army during World War I.

"Bohemian corporal" was a derogatory term used (privately) in World War II for Adolf Hitler by German generals (many of whom were Prussian aristocrats: von) dissatisfied with Hitler's military leadership and detailed control such as Gerd von Rundstedt, Erich von Manstein and Friedrich Paulus. Rundstedt said often during and after the war, "Without Hitler's consent, I can't even move my own sentry from my front door around to the back!" Wilhelm Keitel once asked Hitler, "Do you realise that Rundstedt called you a Bohemian corporal?" Hitler replied, "Yes, but he is the best field marshal I have". Von Rundstedt used the term "Dieser böhmische Gefreiter", which he had gotten in the 1930s from a World War I hero, German President Paul von Hindenburg. Hindenburg, who took an instant mutual dislike to Hitler on their first meeting, mistook Hitler's home town of Braunau in Austria (Braunau am Inn) for another town of the same name (Broumov, German: Braunau) in Bohemia and initially said "Austrian corporal" but later used "Bohemian corporal", which was a pejorative term, as he regarded Bohemians as "essentially gypsies", unlike the more cultured Prussians or even Austrians.

Switzerland

Austria

Gefreiter (abbr. Gfr) is a military rank of the Austrian Bundesheer. It might be comparable to enlisted men OR2/ private 1st Class ranks in Anglophone armed forces. However, in the Bundesheer it belongs to the so-called charges rank group (OR2 to OR4).

Austro-Hungarian Army
In the k.u.k. Austro-Hungarian Army (1867–1918) Gefreiter was corresponding to Patrouilleführer, and Vormeister. It was used by the k.u.k. Kaiserjäger as well as the Feldjäger, Standschützen troops, k.u.k. Cavalry, Medical corps, and Infantry.

Then rank insignia was a single white celluloid-star on the stand-up collar of the so-called Waffenrock (en: Tunic) on gorget patch (de: Paroli). Stand-up collar and background of the gorget patch showed a particular egalisation colour.

 Rank insignia

Gefreiter in adjustation of the infantry

 See also

Russia 

Yefreytor is a German loanword in Russian and denotes a similar rank in the Russian army.

In Russia, the rank of yefreytor was introduced by Peter I in 1716 to the infantry, cavalry and engineer forces. The rank was not used after 1722. During the reign of Paul I it was made an equivalent rank to private, which after the reign of Alexander I was used only for the Imperial Guard. Yefreytor was re-introduced in the course of the military reforms of 1826.

In the armed forces of the Soviet Union (and later the Russian Federation) yefreytor is the highest rank of enlisted personnel. According to NATO-rank system the rank might be comparable to OR-4 in Anglophone armed forces.

Rank insignia

Imperial Russian Army

Red Army (RA) and Soviet Armed Forces (SA)

Russian Liberation Army

Russian Armed Forces

See also 
 Ranks of the Imperial German Army
 World War II German Army ranks and insignia
 Rank insignia of the German armed forces
 Ranks and insignia of NATO armies enlisted
 History of Russian military ranks

References 

Military ranks of Germany
Military ranks of Switzerland
Military ranks of Austria
Military ranks of the Soviet Union
Military ranks of Russia